The 163rd Street–Amsterdam Avenue station is a local station on the IND Eighth Avenue Line of the New York City Subway, located in Washington Heights, Manhattan, at the intersection of Amsterdam and Saint Nicholas Avenues. It is served by the C train at all times except nights, when the A train takes over service.

History
The station opened on September 10, 1932, as part of the city-operated Independent Subway System (IND)'s initial segment, the Eighth Avenue Line between Chambers Street and 207th Street. While the IRT Broadway–Seventh Avenue Line already provided service to Washington Heights, the new Eighth Avenue subway via St. Nicholas Avenue provided an alternative route.

Under the 2015–2019 MTA Capital Plan, the station underwent a complete overhaul as part of the Enhanced Station Initiative and was entirely closed for several months. Updates included cellular service, Wi-Fi, USB charging stations, interactive service advisories and maps. A request for proposals for the 72nd Street, 86th Street, Cathedral Parkway–110th Street, and 163rd Street–Amsterdam Avenue stations was issued on June 1, 2017, and the New York City Transit and Bus Committee officially recommended that the MTA Board should award the $111 million contract to ECCO III Enterprises in October 2017. As part of the renovations, the station was closed on March 12, 2018 and reopened on September 27, 2018.

Station layout

This underground station has two local tracks and two side platforms. Two express tracks, used by the A train during daytime hours, run below the station and are not visible from the platforms. To the north, the upper level local tracks become the center tracks of 168th Street, allowing C trains to terminate there, while the lower level express tracks become the outer tracks, continuing towards 207th Street.

Both platforms have mosaic name tablets reading "163RD STREET - AMSTERDAM AVE." in white sans-serif lettering broken onto two lines. The background is yellow with a black border. Small black "163" and directional signs in white lettering run at regular intervals, but there is no trim line on either platform. Grey (previously yellow) I-beam columns run along both platforms, alternating ones having the standard black station name plate with white lettering.

This station has a full length mezzanine supported by I-beam columns above the platforms, but only the southern half is opened. The open southern half has three staircases from each platform, black I-beams, and two sets of turnstile banks leading to the center or the extreme south end of the mezzanine. The closed northern half is walled off and retained the original yellow-colored I-beams. The staircases from the platforms to this portion have been removed.

Prior to the station's renovation, the open southern half was split into three sections by two black steel fences, and free transfers between directions were not possible. Outside fare control, there is a token booth. The closed northern half was gated off and had an exit-only turnstile leading to the fare control area at the center, and three gated staircases from each platform.

The 2018 artwork at this station is Ciguapa Antellana, me llamo sueño de la madrugada. (who more sci-fi than us), a glass mosaic by Firelei Báez. The artwork consists of four pieces, two on the mezzanine and one on each platform. The mosaic contains leaves and vines, as well as symbolism that is evocative of Baez's Caribbean ancestry.

Exits
The open southern half of the mezzanine has three exits:
 One stair at the southeast corner of 161st Street and Amsterdam Avenue.
 One stair at the northeast corner of 161st Street and St. Nicholas Avenue.
 One stair built inside 1033 Saint Nicholas Avenue (at the western corner of 162nd Street and Amsterdam Avenue), which is currently a Rite Aid pharmacy.

The closed northern half had three exits leading to 163rd Street. One exit, which has temporarily been uncovered as an area to haul out debris from renovations, goes to the southeast corner. The other two went to the southwest corner and remain sealed.

References

External links 

 
 Station Reporter – C Train
 The Subway Nut – 163rd Street–Amsterdam Avenue Pictures 
 161st Street entrance from Google Maps Street View
 162nd Street / Amsterdam Avenue entrance from Google Maps Street View
 Platform from Google Maps Street View (2016)
 Platforms from Google Maps Street View (2018; Post-Rebuild)
 Mezzanine from Google Maps Street View (2018; Post-Rebuild)

Washington Heights, Manhattan
IND Eighth Avenue Line stations
New York City Subway stations in Manhattan
Railway stations in the United States opened in 1932
1932 establishments in New York City